Two destroyers of the Imperial Japanese Navy were named Kisaragi:

 , a  launched in 1905 and scrapped in 1928
 , a  launched in 1925 and sunk in 1941

Imperial Japanese Navy ship names
Japanese Navy ship names